The Roman Catholic Diocese of Rotterdam is a Latin diocese of the Catholic Church in South Holland province of the Netherlands. The diocese is a suffragan in the ecclesiastical province of the Metropolitan Archbishop of Utrecht. Since 2011, the bishop has been Hans van den Hende.

The cathedral ecclesiastical see is the Kathedrale Kerk van de HH Laurentius en Elisabeth, dedicated to Saints Lawrence and Elisabeth, in Rotterdam. The only minor basilica is Basiliek van de H. Liduina en Onze Lieve Vrouw van de Rozenkrans, dedicated to St. Liduina and Our Lady of the Rosary, in Schiedam.

History 
It was erected on July 16, 1955, on territory from the split off from the Diocese of Haarlem, from which at the same time the Diocese of Groningen was also split off.

It enjoyed a papal visit from Pope John Paul II in May 1985.

Statistics 
As per 2014, it pastorally served 531,600 Catholics (14.5% of 3,655,000 total, mainly protestants and atheists) on 3,403 km² in 75 parishes, with 358 priests (110 diocesan, 248 religious), 34 deacons, 452 lay religious (289 brothers, 163 sisters) and 6 seminarians.

Ordinaries 
(all Roman Rite)

Suffragan bishops of Rotterdam
 Martien Jansen (10 March 1956 – 2 January 1970), emeritate as titular bishop of Basti (2 January 1970 – death 29 November 1970)
 Adrianus Johannes Simonis (29 December 1970 – 27 June 1983), later president of Episcopal Conference of the Netherlands (1983 – 26 January 2008), coadjutor archbishop of Utrecht (Netherlands) (27 June 1983 – 3 December 1983) succeeding as Metropolitan Archbishop of Utrecht (3 December 1983 – retired 14 April 2007), created cardinal-priest of S. Clemente (25 May 1985 – ...), acting as Apostolic Administrator of Utrecht (Netherlands) (14 April 2007 – retired 11 December 2007)
 Ronald Philippe Bär, Benedictine Order (O.S.B.) (19 October 1983 – 13 March 1993), succeeding as previous auxiliary bishop of Rotterdam (15 January 1982 – 19 October 1983) and titular bishop of Leges (15 January 1982 – 19 October 1983); concurrently last military vicar of Netherlands (22 November 1982 – 21 July 1986), promoted first military ordinary of Netherlands (21 July 1986 – retired 13 March 1993)
 Adrianus van Luyn, Salesians (S.D.B.) (27 November 1993 – 14 January 2011), concurrently vice-president of Council of European Bishops’ Conferences (2000 – 2006.03) promoted to president of Council of European Bishops’ Conferences (2006.03 – 14 January 2011) and president of Episcopal Conference of the Netherlands (26 January 2008 – 14 January 2011); stayed on as Apostolic Administrator of Rotterdam (14 January 2011 – 10 May 2011)
 Hans van den Hende (10 May 2011 – ...), concurrently president of Episcopal Conference of the Netherlands (14 June 2016 – ...); previously coadjutor bishop of Breda (Netherlands) (9 September 2006 – 31 October 2007) succeeded as Bishop of Breda (31 October 2007 – 10 May 2011)

List of churches

Partial list of historical church buildings
 Cathedral of Saints Laurentius and Elisabeth, Rotterdam
 Saint Hippolytus Chapel, Delft
 Saint Maria of Jesse, Delft

Deanery of The Hague
The official website of the diocese shows the Catholic communities organized in two vicariates (also known as deaneries). The two deaneries are further organized into subgroups of parishes, federations and clusters.
The Hague Vicariate has the following parishes, federations or clusters:
Parish of Saint Augustine (Parochie H. Augustinus), Katwijk aan den Rijn, Oegstgeest, Voorschoten, Wassenaar
Parish of Saint Barnabas (Parochie St. Barnabas), Haastrecht
Parish of Saint Bartholomew (Parochie H. Bartholomeus), Schoonhoven
Parish of Saint John the Baptist (Parochie St. Jan de Doper), Bodegraven, Boskoop, Gouda, Moordrecht, Reeuwijk, Waddinxveen
Parish of Saint Martin (Parochie Sint Maarten), Noordwijk, Noordwijkerhout, Sassenheim/Warmond, Voorhout
Parish of Saint Nicholas (Parochie H. Nicolaas), Zoetermeer
Parish of Peace of Christ (Parochie Pax Christi), Kamerik, Meije en Zegveld, Oudewater, Woerden, (including the work area of Saint Gabriel in Haastrecht)
Parish of Saints Peter and Paul (Parochie HH Petrus en Paulus), Leiden, Leiderdorp, Zoeterwoude-Rijndijk, Zoeterwoude-Dorp, Stompwijk
Vicariate of Merenwijk (Vicariaat De Merenwijk), Leiden
Parish of Saint Thomas (Parochie H. Thomas), Alphen aan den Rijn, Hazerswoude-Dorp, Hazerswoude-Rijndijk
Parish of The Four Evangelists (Parochie De Vier Evangelisten), The Hague
Parish of Saint Willibrord (Parochie H. Willibrordus), De Zilk, Hillegom, Lisse

Federation of Saints Clare and Francis (Federatie HH. Clara en Francisucus)
Parish of Saint Clare of Assisi (Parochie Heilige Clara), Aarlanderveen, Langeraar, Nieuwkoop, Nieuwvee, Noorden, Zevenhoven
Parish of Saint Francis of Assisi (Parochie Heilige Franciscus), Hoogmade/Woubrugge, Leimuiden, Oude Wetering, Oud Ade/Rijpwetering

Cluster of The Hague North (Cluster Den Haag Noord)
Parish of Saint Agnes (Parochie H. Agnes), The Hague
Parish of Saint Anthony the Abbot (Parochie H. Antonius Abt), The Hague
Parish of Saint Anthony of Padua (Parochie H. Antonius van Padua), The Hague
Parish of The Holy Three Kings (Parochie H. Driekoningen), The Hague
Parish of Saint Ignatius of Loyola (Parochie H. Ignatius van Loyola), The Hague
Parish of Saint James the Greater (Parochie H. Jacobus de Meerdere), The Hague
Parish of Saint Willibrord (Parochie H. Willibrordus), The Hague

Cluster Vlietstreek
Parish of The Holy Trinity (Parochie Trinitas), Leidschendam
Parish of Saint Boniface (Parochie H. Bonifatius), Rijswijk
Parish of the Risen Christ (Parochie De Verrezen Christus), Voorburg
Parish of Saint Martin (Parochie St. Maarten), Voorburg

Deanery of Rotterdam
The deanery has the following parishes, federation and clusters:
Parish of the Good Shepherd (Parochie De Goede Herder), Maassluis, Schiedam, Vlaardingen
Parish of Saints Michael and Clement (Parochie H.H. Michaël en Clemens), Rotterdam
Parish of Saint Nicholas Pieck and Companions (Parochie H. Nicolaas Pieck en Gezellen), Brielle, Hellevoetsluis, Rhoon, Rotterdam-Hooglviet, Rozenburg, Spijkenisse
Parish of Saint Theresa of Avila (Parochie H. Theresia van Avila), H.I. AMbacht/Zwijndrecht, Dordrecht, Alblasserdam/Papendrecht/Sliedrecht
Parish of Our Lady of Sion (Parochie O.L. Vrouw van Sion), Den Hoorn, Maasland, Schipluiden
Parish of Saint Ursula (Parochie St. Ursula), Delft
Parish of the Holy Family (Parochie De Heilige Familie), Achthuizen, Middelharnis, Oud Beijerland, Oude Tonge, Puttershoek

Federation Driestromenland (Federatie Driestromenland)
Parish of the Trinity (Parochie Heilige Drie-eenheid), Everdingen/Leerdam/Vianen
Parish of the Holy Martyrs of Gorcum (Parochie H.H. Martelaren van Gorcum), Arkel/Gorinchem/Hardinxveld-Giessendam

Federatie IPV-5
Parish of Saint Paul Conversion (Parochie St. Paulus Bekering), Capelle aan den IJssel
Parish of Mary, Queen (Parochie Maria Koningin), Krimpen aan den IJssel
Parish of Saint Joseph (Parochie St. Joseph), Nieuwerkerk aan den IJssel
Parish of Saint Cecelia (Parochie St. Caecilia), Rotterdam-Alexander
Vicariaat Ommoord-Zevenkamp, Rotterdam-Ommoord

Federatie H. Maria Magdalena
Parish of Saint Augustine (Parochie St. Augustinus), Barendrecht
Parish of Saint George (Parochie St. Joris), Ridderkerk
Parish of Emmaus (Parochie De Emmausgangers), Rotterdam
Parish of the Trinity (Parochie H. Drie Eenheid), Rotterdam
Parish of Our Lady of Lourdes (Parochie OLV van Lourdes), Rotterdam

Federation of Oostland (Federatie Oostland)
Parish of Saint Willibrord (Parochie St. Willibrord), Bergschenhoek
Parish of The Nativity of Mary (Parochie O.L. Vrouw Geboorte), Berkel en Rodenrijs
Parish of Our Lady's Visitation (Parochie O.L. Vrouw Visitatie), Bleiswijk
Parish of Saint Bartholomew (Parochie H. Bartholomeus), Nootdorp
Parish of Saint John the Baptist (Parochie H. Joannes de Dooper), Pijnacker

Federatie St. Franciscus, tussen duin en tuin (Westland (municipality), Netherlands)
Parish of the Holy Martyrs of Gorcum (Parochie HH. Martelaren van Gorcum), De Lier
Parish of Our Lady's Assumption into Heaven (Parochie OLV ten Hemelopneming), 's-Gravenzande
Parish of Saint Egbert and Lambert (Parochie H. Egbertus / H. Lambertus), Hook of Holland
Parish of Our Lady of Good Counsel (Parochie OLV van Goeden Raad), Honselersdijk
Parish of Saint Andrew (Parochie H. Andreas), Kwintsheul
Community of Saint James (Geloofsgemeenschap H. Jacobus), Maasdijk
Parish of Saint Malo of Brittany (Parochie H. Machutus), Monster, South Holland
Parish of Saint Adrian (Parochie St. Adrianus), Naaldwijk
Parish of Saint Bartholomew (Parochie H. Bartholomeus), Poeldijk
Parish of Saint John the Baptist (Parochie St. Jan de Doper), Wateringen
Parish of Saint Joseph (Parochie St. Joseph), Wateringen

Federatie Rotterdam Rechter Maasoever
Parish of Saint Lambert (Parochie H. Lambertus), Rotterdam
Cathedral Parish of Saints Lawrence and Elisabeth (Parochie H.H. Laurentius & Elisabeth), Rotterdam
Parish of Saints Lawrence and Ignatius (Parochie H.H. Laurentius & Ignatius), Rotterdam
Parish of the Peace of Christ (Parochie Pax Christi), Rotterdam
Parish of Saint Dominic (Parochie H. Dominicus), Rotterdam
Parish of Saints Francis and Clare (Parochie H.H. Franciscus en Clara), Rotterdam
Parish of Saint Joseph (Parochie H. Joseph), Rotterdam
Parish of Our Lady of the Holy Rosary and Saint Albert (Parochie OLV Rozenkrans en H. Albertus), Rotterdam
Parish of Saint Nicholas (Parochie H. Nicolaas), Rotterdam
Parish of the Four Evangelists (Parochie De Vier Evangelisten), Rotterdam

See also
 Catholic Church in the Netherlands
Dutch pages about the many church buildings in the Diocese of Rotterdam

References

External links
Diocese of Rotterdam official website in Dutch
rapportnr. 550  (in Dutch) Kerncijfers 2005 uit de kerkelijke statistiek van het Rooms-Katholiek Kerkgenootschap in Nederland - - PDF file with statistics by diocese can be downloaded
 GCatholic.org
 Catholic Hierarchy

 
Rotterdam
Culture of South Holland